Constituencies 1955–1974 | Feb 1974 MPs | Oct 1974 MPs | 1979 MPs | Constituencies in 1983–1997

This is a list of all constituencies that were in existence at the February 1974, October 1974 and 1979 General Elections, showing the winning party and broken down by region and county.

South West (43)

Cornwall (5)

Devon (10)

Somerset (7)

Dorset (4)

Gloucestershire (12)

Wiltshire (5)

South East (73)

Oxfordshire (4)

Buckinghamshire (6)

Berkshire (6)

Hampshire (16)

Isle of Wight (1)

Surrey (11)

Sussex (14)

Kent (15)

Greater London (92)

North West London (26)
The boroughs of Hillingdon, Harrow, Brent, Ealing, Barnet, Camden, Hammersmith & Fulham, Kensington & Chelsea, Westminster and the City of London.

North East London (28)
The boroughs of Barking & Dagenham, Enfield, Hackney, Haringey, Havering, Islington, Newham, Redbridge, Tower Hamlets and Waltham Forest.

South West London (18)
The boroughs of Croydon, Hounslow, Kingston, Merton, Richmond, Sutton and Wandsworth.

South East London (20)
The boroughs of Bexley, Bromley, Greenwich, Lambeth, Lewisham and Southwark.

East Anglia (45)

Bedfordshire (5)

Hertfordshire (9)

Huntingdonshire and Peterborough (2)

Cambridgeshire and Isle of Ely (3)

Norfolk (7)

Suffolk (5)

Essex (14)

East Midlands (42)

Derbyshire (10)

Nottinghamshire (10)

Lincolnshire and Rutland (9)

Leicestershire (10)

Northamptonshire (5)

West Midlands (56)

Shropshire (4)

Staffordshire (18)

Herefordshire (2)

Worcestershire (9)

Warwickshire (23)

North West (82)

Cumberland (4)

Westmorland (1)

Lancashire (59)

Cheshire (18)

North East (27)

Northumberland (10)

County Durham (17)

Yorkshire (56)

York (1)

North Riding (8)

West Riding (40)

East Riding (7)

Wales (36)

Anglesey (1)

Carnarvonshire (2)

Denbighshire (2)

Flintshire (2)

Merionethshire (1)

Montgomeryshire (1)

Cardiganshire (1)

Pembrokeshire (1)

Carmarthenshire (2)

Breconshire and Radnorshire (1)

Glamorgan (16)

Monmouthshire (6)

Scotland (71)

Orkney and Shetland (1)

Caithness and Sutherland (1)

Inverness-shire and Ross and Cromarty (3)

Moray and Nairnshire (1)

Banffshire (1)

Aberdeenshire (4)

Angus and Kincardineshire (4)

Argyll (1)

Perthshire and Kinross-shire (2)

Ayrshire and Bute (5)

Renfrewshire (4)

Dunbartonshire (3)

Stirlingshire and Clackmannanshire (3)

Fife (4)

West Lothian (1)

Midlothian (8)

Lanarkshire (21)

Dumfriesshire (1)

Kircudbrightshire and Wigtownshire (1)

Roxburghshire, Selkirkshire and Peeblesshire (1)

Berwickshire and East Lothian (1)

Northern Ireland (12)

Antrim (6)

Down (2)

Antrim (1)

Fermanagh and Tyrone (2)

Londonderry (1) 

1974
1970s in the United Kingdom
1980s in the United Kingdom